Charles "Charlie" W. Renilson (born 14 September 1938) is a Scottish former rugby union, and professional rugby league footballer who played in the 1950s, 1960s and 1970s, serving in the Duke of Wellington's Regiment.

Playing career

International honours
Charlie Renilson represented Commonwealth XIII (RL) while at Halifax in 1965 against New Zealand at Crystal Palace National Recreation Centre, London on Wednesday 18 August 1965, and won caps for Great Britain (RL) while at Halifax in 1965 against New Zealand, in 1967 against Australia (sub), in 1968 against France (2 matches), in the 1968 Rugby League World Cup against Australia, France and New Zealand, and in 1968 against France.

Championship final appearances
Charlie Renilson played in Halifax's 15–7 victory over St. Helens in the Rugby Football League Championship Final during the 1964–65 season at Station Road, Swinton on Saturday 22 May 1965.

County Cup Final appearances
Charlie Renilson played , and scored a try in Halifax's 10–0 victory over Featherstone Rovers in the 1963 Yorkshire County Cup Final during the 1963–64 season at Belle Vue, Wakefield on Saturday 2 November 1963.

Testimonial match
Charlie Renilson's Testimonial match at Halifax took place in 1968.

Honoured at Halifax
Charlie Renilson is a Halifax Hall of Fame inductee.

References

External links
!Great Britain Statistics at englandrl.co.uk (statistics currently missing due to not having appeared for both Great Britain, and England)
(archived by web.archive.org) …and in Townsville

1938 births
Living people
Duke of Wellington's Regiment soldiers
Footballers who switched code
Great Britain national rugby league team players
Halifax R.L.F.C. players
Jed-Forest RFC players
Newtown Jets players
Rugby league locks
Rugby league players from Edinburgh
Rugby league second-rows
Rugby union players from Edinburgh
Scottish rugby league players
Scottish rugby union players
Sydney Roosters players